This list of museums in West Yorkshire, England contains museums which are defined for this context as institutions (including nonprofit organisations, government entities, and private businesses) that collect and care for objects of cultural, artistic, scientific, or historical interest and make their collections or related exhibits available for public viewing. Also included are non-profit art galleries and university art galleries.  Museums that exist only online (i.e., virtual museums) are not included.

Defunct museums
 Clarke Hall, Wakefield, 17th-century country house and gardens, closed in 2012
 Harmonium Museum, Saltaire, collection of reed organs and harmoniums, closed in 2011
 Keighley Private Classic Car Museum, Keighley, also known as Yorkshire Car Collection
 Rugby League Heritage Centre, Huddersfield, closed in 2013 due to sale of building, seeking new location
 Transperience, Low Moor, Bradford, closed in 1997
 Wakefield Art Gallery, closed March 2009, collections moving to the Hepworth Wakefield
 Yorkshire Motor Museum, also known as Scopos Mills Motor Museum, Batley, closed in 2010

See also
:Category:Tourist attractions in West Yorkshire

References

 
West Yorkshire
Museums